Siege of Ranthambore may refer to:

 Siege of Ranthambore (1236), in which Vagbhata Chauhan defeated Delhi Ruler Razia 
 Siege of Ranthambore (1291), which the Delhi Sultanate ruler Jalaluddin Khalji withdrew and retreated
 Siege of Ranthambore (1301), in which the Delhi Sultanate ruler Alauddin Khalji defeated the Chahamana king Hammiradeva
 Siege of Ranthambore (1568), in which the Mughal emperor Akbar defeated Surjan Hada